These were the team rosters of the nations participating in the Girls' ice hockey tournament of the 2012 Winter Youth Olympics. Each team was permitted a roster of 15 skaters and 2 goaltenders.

Austria 
The following is the Austrian roster for the Girls' ice hockey tournament at the 2012 Winter Youth Olympics.

Head coach: Christian Yngve

Germany 
The following is the German roster for the Girls' ice hockey tournament at the 2012 Winter Youth Olympics.

Head coach: Maritta Becker

Kazakhstan 
The following is the Kazakhstani roster for the Girls' ice hockey tournament at the 2012 Winter Youth Olympics.

Head coach: Mariya Topkayeva

Slovakia 
The following is the Slovak roster for the Girls' ice hockey tournament at the 2012 Winter Youth Olympics.

Head coach: Stanislav Kubuš

Sweden 
The following is the Sweden roster for the Girls' ice hockey tournament at the 2012 Winter Youth Olympics.

Head coach: Henrik Cedergren

References

Ice hockey at the 2012 Winter Youth Olympics